Montgomery Township is one of the nineteen townships of Wood County, Ohio, United States.  The 2010 census found 4,230 people in the township, 1,752 of whom lived in the unincorporated portions of the township.

Geography
Located in the eastern part of the county, it borders the following townships:
Freedom Township - north
Madison Township, Sandusky County - northeast corner
Scott Township, Sandusky County - east
Jackson Township, Seneca County - southeast corner
Perry Township - south
Bloom Township - southwest corner
Portage Township - west
Center Township - northwest corner

Three villages are located in Montgomery Township:
Bradner in the northeast.
Risingsun in the southeast.
Wayne in the center.

Name and history
Montgomery Township was established in 1834. Statewide, other Montgomery Townships are located in Ashland and Marion counties.

Government
The township is governed by a three-member board of trustees, who are elected in November of odd-numbered years to a four-year term beginning on the following January 1. Two are elected in the year after the presidential election and one is elected in the year before it. There is also an elected township fiscal officer, who serves a four-year term beginning on April 1 of the year after the election, which is held in November of the year before the presidential election. Vacancies in the fiscal officership or on the board of trustees are filled by the remaining trustees.

The Montgomery Township Hall is located on the corner of Mermill Road at Bradner Road.

References

External links
County website

Townships in Wood County, Ohio
Townships in Ohio